The following lists events that happened during 1985 in Singapore.

Incumbents
President: C.V. Devan Nair (until 28 March), Wee Chong Jin (Acting) (28 to 29 March), Yeoh Ghim Seng (Acting) (29 March to 2 September), Wee Kim Wee (starting 2 September)
Prime Minister: Lee Kuan Yew

Events

January
 January - Funan Centre opens to the public. It evolved to Funan The IT Mall, and finally Funan DigitaLife Mall, closing its doors on 30 June 2016.

February
 1 February – The Small Claims Tribunal is established as part of the Subordinate Courts (present day State Courts of Singapore), which mainly deals with small claims.

March
 28 March – Singapore's third President Devan Nair resigns. Chief Justice Wee Chong Jin and later Speaker of Parliament Yeoh Ghim Seng temporarily serve as acting president during that time.

April
 2 April – The NTUC Pasir Ris Resort starts construction. When completed, the resort will have a wide array of recreational activities, supporting up to 1,400 people at any time. The resort is officially opened in 1988.
 15 April – The Feedback Unit is formed to allow people to feedback their concerns to the Government. It has since been replaced by REACH in 2006.

May
 16 May – The first case of HIV is diagnosed at the Communicable Diseases Centre (present day National Centre for Infectious Diseases). The patient is subsequently warded at the CDC.
 23 May - An 18 year old student, Winnifred Teo Suan Lie became a victim of rape and murder. Her naked body was discovered in bushes by police along Old Holland Road. It remains an unsolved case.

June
 24 June – The National University Hospital is opened to the public, the first government-owned hospital to be privately run.

August
 30 August – Wee Kim Wee becomes the fourth President of Singapore. He takes office on 2 September.

December
2 December – The Second Series Coins are launched, with the 5-cent, 10-cent, 20-cent and 50-cent coins the first to be issued.

Date unknown
Singapore slips into its first recession during that time, as well as the Pan Electric crisis. (Early 1985)
Shop N Save starts operations as a supermarket.
Sheng Siong starts operations as a supermarket, taking over from the Savewell supermarket chain, which closed down the following year due to financial problems.

Births
 22 January – Yan Xu, table tennis player.
 9 April – Romeo Tan, actor.
 16 June – Andie Chen, actor.

Deaths
 15 February – Chen Chong Swee - Artist (b. 1910).
 2 March – Runme Shaw - Founder of Shaw Organisation, philanthropist (b. 1901).

References

 
Singapore
Years in Singapore
Singapore